School District 15 is a Canadian school district in New Brunswick.

District 15 is an Anglophone district operating 14 public schools (gr. K-12) in Restigouche and Gloucester Counties.

Current enrollment is approximately 4,000 students and 280 teachers.  District 15 is headquartered in Dalhousie.

List of schools

High schools
 Bathurst High School
 Dalhousie Regional High School
 Sugarloaf Senior High School

Middle schools
 Campbellton Middle School
 Dalhousie Middle School
 Superior Middle School

Elementary schools
 Janeville Elementary School
 L.E. Reinsborough School
 Lord Beaverbrook School
 Parkwood Elementary School
 Terry Fox Elementary School
 Tide Head School

Combined elementary and middle schools
 Belledune School
 Jacquet River School

Other schools
 Bathurst Learning Center
 Campbellton Learning Center
 Dalhousie Learning Center

External links
 http://www.district15.nbed.nb.ca

Former school districts in New Brunswick